Karel Kaers (3 June 1914 – 20 December 1972) was a Belgian professional cyclist with 30 wins.

Kaers was born in Vosselaar.  In 1934 he became the youngest world road champion, winning in Leipzig at 20. It was the first time he had ridden the race. He also won the Tour of Flanders in 1939, and the Belgian national championship in 1937.

His last race was on the track at Ordrup, near Copenhagen, Denmark, on 9 May 1948. He finished fourth in an omnium competition.

Youngest world champion 

Lance Armstrong is frequently described as the youngest world champion. In fact, he was only the third youngest road champion when he took the rainbow jersey in Oslo in 1993. Armstrong was two weeks short of 22; Kaers had just turned 20. Jean-Pierre Monseré was three weeks short of 22 when he became champion in Leicester on 16 August 1970.

History
Karel Kaers started racing at 14 and won 37 events in his first two years, including the Belgian boys' championship on the road. He became a junior in 1931 and won the national sprint championship. He became an independent, or semi-professional, and then a full professional in 1932, riding mainly on the track until 1934.

In 1934 he began riding more on the road, winning the world championship at Leipzig. That winter he rode 1m 9.6s for a standing-start kilometre and, another track record, 1m 48s for the flying-start kilometre, both on the Vélodrome d'Hiver in Paris. He won the 320 km Circuit of Paris road race in 1937, then rode the track again in the winter and equalled Jeff Scherens' record of 29.6s for 500 metres. He then broke the world one-mile record at Wembley, during the six-day race, by riding 1m 49.6s.

His weight, 85 kg, made him a poor climber and he never succeeded in hilly races.

Retirement
Karel Kaers ran a bar inside the entrance to the Sportpaleis track in Antwerp after he stopped racing.  He died in Antwerp, aged 58.

Palmarès 

1930
  U17 road champion
1931–1932
  U19 sprint champion
1934
  world road champion
 3rd, national sprint championship
1935 - Francis Pélissier
 3rd, national sprint championship
1936 - Colin
 1st, 6 Days of Paris (with Albert Billiet)
 3rd, national sprint championship
1937 - Alcyon, Bury
  Road Race Champion
 1st, Circuit de Paris
 3rd, national sprint championship
1938 - Alcyon, Bury
 1st, Stage 1, Paris-Saint Etienne
1939 - Alcyon
  pursuit champion
 1st, Tour of Flanders
 1st, 6 Days of London (with Omer De Bruycker)
 1st, 6 Days of Copenhague (with Omer De Bruycker)
 3rd, national sprint championship
1940 - Alcyon
 1st, 6 Day of Brussels (with Omer De Bruycker)
 2nd, National motor-paced championship
1941
 1st, Omloop der Vlaamse Gewesten
 2nd, national sprint championship
1942
 1st, 3 Days of Antwerp (with Achiel Bruneel
 2nd, national omnium championship
1944 - A. Trialoux
1947 - Magali

Teams 
1933-1934: Unknown
1935: Pélissier-Hutchinson
1936: Colin-Wolber and Bristol
1937: Bury and Alcyon-Dunlop
1938: Dilecta-Wolber and Bury and Alcyon-Dunlop
1939-1940: Alcyon-Dunlop
1941-1943: Unsponsored
1944: Trialoux-Wolber
1945-1946: Unsponsored
1947: Magali
1948: Individual

References

External links 

1914 births
1972 deaths
Belgian male cyclists
UCI Road World Champions (elite men)
Cyclists from Antwerp Province
People from Vosselaar